Mawbanna is a locality and small rural community in the local government area of Circular Head, in the North West region of Tasmania, Australia. The Arthur River forms the southern boundary, while the Black River forms a small part of the western boundary. The 2016 census determined a population of 135 for the state suburb of Mawbanna.

History

“Mawbana” is an Aboriginal word for “black”. It is likely that the locality name and that of the adjacent river are derived from their Aboriginal names.

The last known thylacine to be killed in the wild was shot in Mawbanna in 1930, on Wilf Batty's farm.

In 1952–1953, the man photographed a live Thylacine before it fled.

Road infrastructure
The C225 route (Mawbanna Road) runs from the Bass Highway through the locality to areas further south.

References

Localities of Circular Head Council
Towns in Tasmania